New York's 128th State Assembly district is one of the 150 districts in the New York State Assembly. It has been represented by Democrat Pamela Hunter since 2015.

Geography
District 128 is in Onondaga County. It contains portions of the city of Syracuse, as well as the surrounding towns of Salina, DeWitt, and Onondaga.

Recent election results

2022

2020

2018

2016

2015 special

2014

2012

References 

128
Onondaga County, New York